The 1959 County Championship was the 60th officially organised running of the County Championship. Yorkshire won the Championship title ending a seven-year winning sequence by Surrey.

Table
12 points for a win
6 points to side still batting in the fourth innings of a match in which scores finish level
2 points for first innings lead
2 bonus points for side leading on first innings if they also score faster on runs per over in first innings
If no play possible on the first two days, and the match does not go into the second innings, the side leading on first innings scores 8 points.

References

1959 in English cricket
County Championship seasons